Orós is a municipality in the state of Ceará in the Northeast region of Brazil. Its largest district is Guassussê.

See also
List of municipalities in Ceará
Orós Dam

References

Municipalities in Ceará